Lucie Lomová (born 23 July 1964 in Prague, Czechoslovakia) is Czech comics author.

She has studied dramatics. Then she was known as an author of the comics Anča a Pepík.

References

External links 
 Oficial Webpage
 Lucie Lomová at the Czech literature Portal
 Lucie Lomová at Comiclopedia

1964 births
Czech artists
Living people